Kenneth Milton Grimwood (February 27, 1944 – June 6, 2003) was an American author, who also published work under the name of Alan Cochran. In his fantasy fiction, Grimwood combined themes of life-affirmation and hope with metaphysical concepts, themes found in his best-known novel,  Replay (1986). It won the 1988 World Fantasy Award for Best Novel.

Background
Grimwood was born in Dothan, Alabama. His family moved to Pensacola, Florida, where he grew up. In his early years, Grimwood took an interest in EC Comics and radio journalism. He attended and graduated in 1961 from Indian Springs School, a private school near Birmingham, Alabama. That summer he went to Paris to study at the Sorbonne. He attended Emory College in Atlanta from 1961 to 1963.

In the mid-1960s, Grimwood worked in news at WLAK in Lakeland, Florida. Heading north, he returned to college, studying psychology at Bard College in Annandale-on-Hudson, New York. He also contributed short fiction to Bard's student publication, Observer in 1969, and graduated in 1970.

Grimwood moved to Los Angeles, California. He wrote some of his early novels while working as nightside editor at KFWB News 980 radio in the city. The success of Replay (1987) enabled him to leave that job and pursue writing full-time.

Personal life
Grimwood was married for a period; he and his wife did not have children.

Among his friends was Tom Atwill (a relative of the actor Lionel Atwill). Atwill described Grimwood's "free spirit lifestyle" and recalled, 
"He was a loner, almost a recluse. He liked small gatherings of friends. We had many dinner parties with him and some friends, and he would always be the one to keep the evening hilarious; he was a great storyteller. He did not like publicity and was actually quite shy... He was a media junkie. He owned the first Betamax sold; he had the largest video library I've ever seen. One of his favorite things to do was for he and I to watch some old movie in the afternoon; we did it often."

Breakthrough
Grimwood's debut novel, Breakthrough (Ballantine, 1976), was strongly influenced by his immersion in EC Comics. It had a blend of science fiction, reincarnation and horror elements that concluded with an unpredictable twist ending. Cured of epilepsy by a breakthrough in medical technology, 26-year-old Elizabeth Austin has miniature electrodes implanted in her brain. She can control her seizures by pressing an external remote to activate the electrodes. Adjusting to a normal life, she is ready to patch up a troubled marriage and resume her abandoned career. However, as part of the implant operation, Elizabeth gave her consent for the insertion of extra electrodes, featuring experimental functions unknown to science. When one of those electrodes is stimulated, Elizabeth experiences memories which are not her own. She discovers the remote has given her the ability to eavesdrop on her previous life 200 years in the past, and she keeps this a secret from her doctor. Intrigued, she finds the earlier existence appealing and begins to spend more and more time there. Eventually, she discovers that the woman in the past is a murderess who is plotting to kill Elizabeth's husband in the present.

Breakthrough went out of print shortly after publication. But author Gary Carden ranked it alongside books by Stephen King and Ray Bradbury as writing a book he could not put down:

In writing this novel, Grimwood did extensive research into brain surgery and epilepsy. Film producer William Castle took an interest in adapting Breakthrough for a movie, but the project was never realized.

Two Plus Two
Grimwood used the pseudonym Alan Cochran for his novel Two Plus Two (Doubleday, 1980). The storyline follows two Los Angeles detectives investigating a trio of murders that they learn involve members of a swingers club.

Replay
Grimwood's novel Replay (Arbor House, 1986), explored the life of 43-year-old radio journalist Jeff Winston after his death. He awakens in 1963 in his 18-year-old body. He begins to relive his life with intact memories of the previous 25 years. This happens repeatedly with different events in each cycle.

In this novel, Grimwood refers back and offers a clue to the identity of the author of Two Plus Two: in one passage the main character of Replay hides his identity by using the name "Alan Cochran".

Richard A. Lupoff had explored a similar premise in his 1973 short story "12:01". The time-loop concept of Replay has been referred to as a precursor of Harold Ramis's comedy-drama film Groundhog Day  (1993), starring Bill Murray.

Another novel that explores the same theme of someone reliving their life again and again upon death is The First Fifteen Lives of Harry August by British author Catherine Webb.

Reception
The novel was a bestseller in Japan, and it won the 1988 World Fantasy Award.

The novel was a selection of the Literary Guild and the Doubleday Book Club. In the succeeding years, it has been included in several lists of recommended reading: Modern Fantasy: The Hundred Best Novels (1988), Aurel Guillemette's The Best in Science Fiction (1993), David Pringle's Ultimate Guide to Science Fiction (1995) and the Locus Reader's Poll: Best Science Fiction Novel (1988). In the Locus 1998 poll of the best fantasy novels published prior to 1990, Replay placed #32. On the Internet Top 100 SF/Fantasy List, Replay was voted to the #43 position in 2000 but climbed to #19 by 2003.

Critic Daniel D. Shade reviewed the novel in 2001:

In 1986 the agent Irene Webb (then at the William Morris Agency, which still represents Grimwood's work) sold the film rights to Replay to United Artists for a $100,000 option against a $400,000 purchase.

As of 2013, Replay has been continuously in print in English, French and Japanese since 1987, is in print in German and Chinese, and is available as an audio book in English (published by Tantor) and in German (published by Audible). Replay was contracted to be published in 2013 in Russian, Turkish, Portuguese, and Indonesian. His earlier novel, Elise (1979), was also contracted to be published in Turkish in 2013.

Into the Deep
Grimwood explored his fascination with cetacean intelligence, encounters with dolphins and research into intraspecies dolphin communication for his novel Into the Deep (William Morrow, 1995). It is about a marine biologist struggling to crack the code of dolphin intelligence. It features lengthy passages written from the point of view of several dolphin characters. To research "the willful denial and gratuitous cruelty" involved in tuna fishing, Grimwood secretly infiltrated the crew of a tuna boat based in San Diego, California.

The publisher described the book:

Grimwood's environmental concerns were also expressed in a letter he wrote to Los Angeles Times in 2002:

Other works

Other novels include The Voice Outside (1982), exploring mind control and telepathy-inducing drugs; and Elise (1979). Born in Versailles in 1683, Elise is immortal because of her DNA. The story traces her experiences with various lovers and husbands through the centuries. Elise is now regarded as a rare book and sells at collector prices.

Death
At age 59, Grimwood died of a heart attack at his home in Santa Barbara, California. In this period, he was working on a sequel to Replay. He is included in the Guide to Santa Barbara Authors and Publishers at the University of California, Santa Barbara. There is at least one unpublished Grimwood novel, a collaboration with Tom Atwill.

See also
List of unpublished books by notable authors

References

External links

 "Ken Grimwood Rules", The Ken Grimwood Library, tribute site
Jo Walton, "Review of Ken Grimwood's Replay: Re-living Your Own Life", Blog - Tor.com, February 2012 
Ken Grimwood,  "Static", in Bard Observer (March 20, 1969)
Ken Grimwood, "Feedback", Bard Observer (April 17, 1969)
 
 "Ken Grimwood", in The Encyclopedia of Science Fiction
 

1944 births
2003 deaths
People from Dothan, Alabama
20th-century American novelists
American fantasy writers
American male novelists
Bard College alumni
Writers from California
World Fantasy Award-winning writers
Indian Springs School alumni
20th-century American male writers